Dulles may refer to:

 John Foster Dulles (1888–1959), United States Secretary of State from 1953 to 1959
 Dulles International Airport, major airport in Northern Virginia in the Washington, D.C. area, named after John Foster Dulles
 Dulles, Virginia, community named after the airport
Dulles High School (Sugar Land, Texas), public high school named after John Foster Dulles
 Allen Dulles (1893–1969), former head of the Central Intelligence Agency, brother of John Foster Dulles
 Eleanor Lansing Dulles (1895–1996), economist and diplomat, sister of Allen and John Foster Dulles
 Foster Rhea Dulles (1900–1970), American journalist and historian, cousin of John Foster Dulles
 John W. F. Dulles (1913–2008), scholar of Brazilian history, son of John Foster Dulles
 Avery Dulles (1918–2008), cardinal of the Roman Catholic Church, son of John Foster Dulles

See also
 Dalles (disambiguation)